The Duffing equation (or Duffing oscillator), named after Georg Duffing (1861–1944), is a non-linear second-order differential equation used to model certain damped and driven oscillators. The equation is given by

The equation describes the motion of a damped oscillator with a more complex potential than in simple harmonic motion (which corresponds to the case ); in physical terms, it models, for example, an elastic pendulum whose spring's stiffness does not exactly obey Hooke's law.

The Duffing equation is an example of a dynamical system that exhibits chaotic behavior. Moreover, the Duffing system presents in the frequency response the jump resonance phenomenon that is a sort of frequency hysteresis behaviour.

Parameters
The parameters in the above equation are:
 controls the amount of damping,
 controls the linear stiffness,
 controls the amount of non-linearity in the restoring force; if  the Duffing equation describes a damped and driven simple harmonic oscillator,
 is the amplitude of the periodic driving force; if  the system is without a driving force, and
 is the angular frequency of the periodic driving force.

The Duffing equation can be seen as describing the oscillations of a mass attached to a nonlinear spring and a linear damper. The restoring force provided by the nonlinear spring is then 

When  and  the spring is called a hardening spring. Conversely, for  it is a softening spring (still with ).

The number of parameters in the Duffing equation can be reduced by two through scaling (in accord with the Buckingham π theorem), e.g. the excursion  and time  can be scaled as:  and  assuming  is positive (other scalings are possible for different ranges of the parameters, or for different emphasis in the problem studied). Then:
whereand

Methods of solution
In general, the Duffing equation does not admit an exact symbolic solution. However, many approximate methods work well:
Expansion in a Fourier series may provide an equation of motion to arbitrary precision.
The  term, also called the Duffing term, can be approximated as small and the system treated as a perturbed simple harmonic oscillator.
The Frobenius method yields a complex but workable solution.
Any of the various numeric methods such as Euler's method and Runge–Kutta methods can be used.
The homotopy analysis method (HAM) has also been reported for obtaining approximate solutions of the Duffing equation, also for strong nonlinearity.

In the special case of the undamped and undriven Duffing equation, an exact solution can be obtained using Jacobi's elliptic functions.

Boundedness of the solution for the unforced oscillator

Undamped oscillator
Multiplication of the undamped and unforced Duffing equation,  with  gives:

with H a constant. The value of H is determined by the initial conditions  and 

The substitution  in H shows that the system is Hamiltonian:
with

and

with the Hamiltonian H being positive.

Damped oscillator
Similarly, for the damped oscillator,

since  for damping. Without forcing the damped Duffing oscillator will end up at (one of) its stable equilibrium point(s).

Frequency response

The forced Duffing oscillator with cubic nonlinearity is described by the following ordinary differential equation:

The frequency response of this oscillator describes the amplitude  of steady state response of the equation (i.e. ) at a given frequency of excitation  For a linear oscillator with  the frequency response is also linear. However, for a nonzero cubic coefficient , the frequency response becomes nonlinear. Depending on the type of nonlinearity, the Duffing oscillator can show hardening, softening or mixed hardening–softening frequency response. Anyway, using the homotopy analysis method or harmonic balance, one can derive a frequency response equation in the following form:

For the parameters of the Duffing equation, the above algebraic equation gives the steady state oscillation amplitude  at a given excitation frequency.

Jumps

For certain ranges of the parameters in the Duffing equation, the frequency response may no longer be a single-valued function of forcing frequency  For a hardening spring oscillator ( and large enough positive ) the frequency response overhangs to the high-frequency side, and to the low-frequency side for the softening spring oscillator ( and ). The lower overhanging side is unstable – i.e. the dashed-line parts in the figures of the frequency response – and cannot be realized for a sustained time. Consequently, the jump phenomenon shows up: 
 when the angular frequency  is slowly increased (with other parameters fixed), the response amplitude  drops at A suddenly to B,
 if the frequency  is slowly decreased, then at C the amplitude jumps up to D, thereafter following the upper branch of the frequency response. 
The jumps A–B and C–D do not coincide, so the system shows hysteresis depending on the frequency sweep direction.

Examples

Some typical examples of the time series and phase portraits of the Duffing equation, showing the appearance of subharmonics through period-doubling bifurcation – as well chaotic behavior – are shown in the figures below.

References

Inline

Historical

Other

.
.
.
.

External links
Duffing oscillator on Scholarpedia
MathWorld page
 

Ordinary differential equations
Chaotic maps